The J.W. Parmley House, at 4th St. and 4th Ave. in Ipswich, South Dakota, was built in 1920.  It was listed on the National Register of Historic Places in 1980.

It is a one-and-a-half-story bungalow-style house built of brick and granite.

References

Houses on the National Register of Historic Places in South Dakota
Houses completed in 1920
Edmunds County, South Dakota